Eisenhardt may refer to:

People
Ben Eisenhardt (born 1990), American-Israeli professional basketball player
Louise Eisenhardt (1891–1967), American neuropathologist
Roy Eisenhardt (born 1939), American lawyer

Other
Hess & Eisenhardt and O'Gara-Hess & Eisenhardt, former names of Centigon

See also
 Eisenhart, a surname
 Eysenhardtia, a genus of flowering plants in the legume family, Fabaceae